Billy McCormack may refer to:

Billy McCormack (Louisiana pastor)
Character in Two Pints of Lager and a Packet of Crisps

See also
William McCormack (disambiguation)